Andrew George Moore (born June 2, 1994) is an American professional baseball pitcher who is currently a free agent. He has played in Major League Baseball (MLB) for the Seattle Mariners. Prior to playing professionally, he played college baseball for the Oregon State Beavers.

Career
Moore attended North Eugene High School in Eugene, Oregon. As a senior at North Eugene, he had a 0.76 earned run average (ERA) with 125 strikeouts in 72 and 2/3 innings. He played college baseball at Oregon State University for the Beavers. During his college career he was 27–9 with a 2.10 earned run average (ERA) and 251 strikeouts.

Seattle Mariners
Moore was drafted by the Seattle Mariners in the second round of the 2015 Major League Baseball Draft. He made his professional debut with the Everett AquaSox. He started 2016 with the Bakersfield Blaze and was promoted to the Jackson Generals during the season.

Moore made his Major League Baseball debut on June 22, 2017 against the Detroit Tigers, going 7 innings, allowing 3 runs on 6 hits, no walks and 4 strikeouts for a quality start and the win. He shuttled between the majors and the minors, making 8 starts and two relief appearances in the majors for the remainder of 2017.

Tampa Bay Rays
On May 25, 2018, the Mariners traded Moore and Tommy Romero to the Tampa Bay Rays for Denard Span and Álex Colomé.

Moore was designated for assignment on April 29, 2019, following the promotion of Nate Lowe.

San Francisco Giants
On May 5, 2019, Moore was claimed off waivers by the San Francisco Giants. He was designated for assignment on May 11, 2019 without appearing for the Giants.

Seattle Mariners (second stint)
On May 17, 2019, Moore was claimed off waivers by the Seattle Mariners. He was designated for assignment by the Mariners in July and outrighted to the AAA Tacoma affiliate. Moore was released by Seattle on October 22, 2019.

Cincinnati Reds
On April 1, 2020, Moore signed a minor league contract with the Cincinnati Reds. He became a free agent on November 2, 2020.

Detroit Tigers
On January 16, 2021, Moore signed a minor league contract with the Detroit Tigers. He was released on August 5, 2021.

Toronto Blue Jays
On June 14, 2022, Moore signed a minor league contract with the Toronto Blue Jays. He was released on August 24, 2022.

References

External links

1994 births
Living people
People from Springfield, Oregon
Baseball players from Oregon
Major League Baseball pitchers
Seattle Mariners players
Oregon State Beavers baseball players
Everett AquaSox players
Bakersfield Blaze players
Jackson Generals (Southern League) players
Arkansas Travelers players
Tacoma Rainiers players
Durham Bulls players
Richmond Flying Squirrels players
Buffalo Bisons (minor league) players